Asura cervicalis is a species of moth of the family Erebidae. It is known from the non-tropical parts of eastern Australia, including areas of New South Wales, Queensland and Victoria. Adults are slim bodied and black with five yellow spots on each forewing. There is a large yellow patch on each hindwing. The moths have sparse grey hairs. There are four tufts of long dense black hair projecting from the verrucae on the meso- and meta-thorax on each side. The larvae have been observed on Ficus, Acacia and Eucalyptus species. It is suspected of feeding only on the lichens on the trunks and branches of these plants. Pupation takes place in a thin cocoon of felted hairs, attached to a wall or tree trunk.

References

cervicalis
Moths described in 1854
Moths of Australia